The 12931 / 12932 Mumbai Central–Ahmedabad Double Decker Express is a Double Decker Express train belonging to Indian Railways that runs between Mumbai Central (MMCT) and Ahmedabad Junction (ADI) in India. It runs 6 days in week except Sunday. It operates as train number 12931 from Mumbai Central to Ahmedabad Junction and as train number 12932 in the reverse direction.

On 20 March 2017, the exteriors of the train departing Mumbai Central were covered with vinyl wrapping advertisements becoming the Indian Railway's first "branded" train. The advertisements were for soap brand Savlon, as part of its Savlon Swasth India Mission, a social awareness initiative for promoting hand hygiene.

Coach composition
12931 / 12932 Mumbai Central - Ahmedabad Double Decker Express  had 11 AC Chair Car & 2 EOG cars. As with most train services in India, coach composition may be amended depending on demand.

Service
12931 / 12932 Mumbai Central - Ahmedabad Double Decker Express was first introduced on 19 September 2012.  it runs 6 days except Sunday.

It covers the distance of 491 kilometres in 6 hours 55 mins as 12931 Mumbai Central - Ahmedabad Double Decker Express & as 12932 Ahmedabad - Mumbai Central Double Decker Express (71 km/hr).

Gallery

References

External links

Sister Trains
 Gujarat Queen
 Karnavati Express
 Mumbai Central - Ahmedabad Passenger
 Mumbai Central-Ahmedabad Shatabdi Express

Mumbai–Ahmedabad trains
Double-decker trains of India
Railway services introduced in 2012
2012 establishments in India
Rail transport in Maharashtra